The Cisnădie is a right tributary of the river Cibin in Romania. It discharges into the Cibin near Mohu. The reach upstream of Cisnădioara is sometimes called Pârâul Argintului.

References

Rivers of Romania
Rivers of Sibiu County